Aurelio Novarini (died September 1606) was a Roman Catholic prelate who served as Archbishop (Personal Title) of San Marco (1602–1606) and Archbishop of Dubrovnik (1591–1602).

Biography
Aurelio Novarini was ordained a priest in the Order of Friars Minor Conventual. On 31 July 1591, he was appointed during the papacy of Pope Gregory XIV as Archbishop of Dubrovnik. On 4 August 1591, he was consecrated bishop by Girolamo Bernerio, Bishop of Ascoli Piceno, with Paolo Alberi, Archbishop Emeritus of Dubrovnik, and Leonard Abel, Titular Bishop of Sidon, serving as co-consecrators. On 1 July 1602, he was appointed during the papacy of Pope Clement VIII as Archbishop (Personal Title) of San Marco. He served as Bishop of San Marco until his death in September 1606.

While bishop, he was the principal co-consecrator of Lorenzo Prezzato, Bishop of Chioggia (1601); Paolo Isaresi della Mirandola, Bishop of Squillace (1601); and Eustache Fontana, Bishop of Andros (1602).

References

External links and additional sources
 (for Chronology of Bishops) 
 (for Chronology of Bishops) 
 (for Chronology of Bishops) 
 (for Chronology of Bishops) 

16th-century Roman Catholic archbishops in the Republic of Venice
17th-century Roman Catholic archbishops in the Republic of Venice
Bishops appointed by Pope Gregory XIV
Bishops appointed by Pope Clement VIII
1606 deaths
Conventual Franciscan bishops